was a  after Chōgen and before Chōkyū. This period spanned the years from April 1037 through 1040.

Change of era
 1037 : The new era name was created to mark an event or series of events. The previous era ended and the new one commenced in Chōgen 10, on the 21st day of the 4th month of 1037.

Events of the Chōryaku era
 1037 (Chōryaku 1, 2nd day of the 7th month): The eldest son of Emperor Go-Suzaku (Prince Chikihito, who was would become Emperor Go-Reizei) has his coming of age ceremony. 
 1037 (Chōryaku 1, 17th day of the 8th month): Go-Suzaku formally names Chikihito as his heir and Crown Prince.
 1038 (Chōryaku 2, 1st day of the 9th month): Fujiwara no Chikaie was killed by a servant during an  attempted robbery; and all the greats of the Fujiwara went into mourning.

Notes

References
 Brown, Delmer M. and Ichirō Ishida, eds. (1979).  Gukanshō: The Future and the Past. Berkeley: University of California Press. ;  OCLC 251325323
 Nussbaum, Louis-Frédéric and Käthe Roth. (2005).  Japan encyclopedia. Cambridge: Harvard University Press. ;  OCLC 58053128
 Titsingh, Isaac. (1834). Nihon Odai Ichiran; ou,  Annales des empereurs du Japon.  Paris: Royal Asiatic Society, Oriental Translation Fund of Great Britain and Ireland. OCLC 5850691
 Varley, H. Paul. (1980). A Chronicle of Gods and Sovereigns: Jinnō Shōtōki of Kitabatake Chikafusa. New York: Columbia University Press. ;  OCLC 6042764

External links
 National Diet Library, "The Japanese Calendar" -- historical overview plus illustrative images from library's collection

Japanese eras